Tavildara is a village and jamoat in Tajikistan. It is located in Sangvor District. It is also the district capital. The jamoat has a total population of 5,950 (2015). It consists of 20 villages, including Tavildara (the seat) and Yozghand.

Tavildara is one of the highest areas in central-eastern Tajikistan, surrounded by the Rasht Valley in the north, the Darvaz mountains in the south and the highest Pamir peaks in the east. It lies on the river Obikhingou (also: Khingob), one of the most powerful mountain rivers of the country, a left tributary of the Vakhsh.
Many prominent scientists proved that the original Tajiks lived in this area, especially in the eastern isolated areas of Tavildara district called Vakhiyo. This territory is also the site of many sacred places, such as Hazrati Burkhi Vali Mausoleum and others. Tavildara's Valley, which is also called Vakhiyo Valley, stretches for 130 km along the river Obikhingou.

References

Populated places in Gorno-Badakhshan